The women's 200 metres event at the 1990 World Junior Championships in Athletics was held in Plovdiv, Bulgaria, at Deveti Septemvri Stadium on 10 and 11 August.

Medalists

Results

Final
11 August
Wind: +1.3 m/s

Semifinals
10 August

Semifinal 1
Wind: -0.9 m/s

Semifinal 2
Wind: +0.5 m/s

Semifinal 3
Wind: +0.9 m/s

Heats
10 August

Heat 1
Wind: +0.4 m/s

Heat 2
Wind: -0.4 m/s

Heat 3
Wind: +0.3 m/s

Heat 4
Wind: +0.7 m/s

Heat 5
Wind: +0.3 m/s

Participation
According to an unofficial count, 34 athletes from 26 countries participated in the event.

References

200 metres
200 metres at the World Athletics U20 Championships